Robert Sosebee Woods (born March 13, 1948) is an American actor best known for playing Bo Buchanan on the ABC soap One Life to Live, a role for which he won the 1983 Daytime Emmy Award for Lead Actor.

Early life
In 1966 Woods graduated from Lakewood High School in Lakewood, California, where he served as senior class president, and a cheerleader. He later joined the U.S. Armed Forces and fought in the Vietnam War. Woods ultimately graduated from California State University, Long Beach where he was a member of the Sigma Alpha Epsilon fraternity.

Career
Woods began portraying Bo Buchanan – a Vietnam War veteran – on the ABC soap One Life to Live in 1979, winning a Daytime Emmy Award for Lead Actor in 1983. He left the series in 1986 and returned 1988, and continued the role until the series cancellation in 2012. Woods also earned Daytime Emmy nominations in 1986, 1993, 1994, 1999, and 2000, multiple Soap Opera Digest Award nominations, and four MVP trophies from Soap Opera Update.

Woods has also appeared on television series such as Roseanne, and the NBC soap opera, Days of Our Lives. He appeared in eight episodes of The Waltons, four credited as "Robert Merritt Woods" and four as "Christopher Woods."

Woods is also the voiceover in the animated TV spot for JPMorgan Chase & Co. that debuted in October 2010.

Personal life
Woods is married to actress Loyita Chapel and lives in New York. The couple have a son, Tanner Woods, who played a young Bo on One Life to Live in an August 26, 2008 flashback to 1968. Tanner was a twin, whose sibling died at the age of one month.

Woods was good friends with on-screen father Phil Carey.

References

External links

Robert S. Woods biography at ABC Daytime

1948 births
Living people
Male actors from California
American male soap opera actors
Daytime Emmy Award winners
Daytime Emmy Award for Outstanding Lead Actor in a Drama Series winners
California State University, Long Beach alumni
People from Lakewood, California
People from Maywood, California